ALF's Hit Talk Show is an American cable television talk show that aired on TV Land in 2004 for seven episodes. The host is the puppet character ALF, of 1980s television fame. At the beginning of each show, ALF is introduced by his "sidekick", Ed McMahon. The show ran in a 30-minute block and featured guests such as Drew Carey and Joe Mantegna. Prior to the series' debut, Entertainment Weekly described ALF's Hit Talk Show as "a one-shot, a lead-in" for TV Land's marathon of the original ALF sitcom.

Format
The show's format is traditional, with ALF sitting behind a desk talking to celebrity guests who drop by for brief chats. In between, there is light banter and some prerecorded comedy skits, usually featuring McMahon or comic actor Kevin Butler. On ALF's desk is a large bowl of snack foods (such as popcorn or peanut brittle) which the guests are invited to eat. (ALF, being an alien and a puppet, does not partake.)

Running jokes on the show include ALF's stated penchant for eating cats, and McMahon's bewilderment at how he ended up saying "And now... Heeeere's ALF!" on a late-night cable show hosted by a B-list 1980s celebrity who is not even human.

Reception
The show's pilot gained enough viewers to merit more episodes; however, ALF's Hit Talk Show was not a hit and is regarded among the greatest talk show flops. In 2009, GetBack.com included it with nine other programs on a list of the "Worst Talk Shows in TV History."

Episodes

External links

References

ALF (TV series)
2004 American television series debuts
2004 American television series endings
2000s American late-night television series
2000s American television talk shows
American television shows featuring puppetry
American television spin-offs
English-language television shows
Television series about extraterrestrial life
Television series about television
Television series created by Paul Fusco
TV Land original programming